The Monti Cimini, in English: Cimini Hills, are a range of densely wooded volcanic hills approximately  north-west of Rome. They are part of the Antiapennine range, facing the Apennines main range towards the Tyrrhenian Sea. Lake Vico, a volcanic crater lake, is situated in the hills.

The vegetation is predominantly beech forestation.  The area is renowned for its hot springs, renaissance villas and Etruscan ruins.

See also
Lake Vico

Cimini, Monti
Cimini
Cimini
Falisci